Esther Béjarano ( Löwy; 15 December 1924 – 10 July 2021) was one of the last survivors of the Auschwitz concentration camp. She survived because she was a player in the Women's Orchestra of Auschwitz. She was active in various ways, including speeches and in music, in keeping the memory of the Holocaust alive. She was a regular speaker at the International Youth Meeting organised yearly at the Max Mannheimer Study Center in Dachau.

Biography 
Born Esther Löwy, she was a daughter of Margarete (Heymann) and Rudolf Loewy, the head cantor of a Jewish municipality, in Saarlouis. Her father encouraged her to get interested in music and Esther learned to play the piano. At the age of 15 she left her parents' home to make an attempt to emigrate to Palestine; the attempt was unsuccessful.

On 20 April 1943, everyone in the camp was deported to the Auschwitz concentration camp. There she had to drag stones until she volunteered to play accordion in the newly formed Women's Orchestra of Auschwitz. Until then, she had only played the piano, never the accordion. Other players included Anita Lasker-Wallfisch. The orchestra had the task, among others, to play for the daily march of the work crews passing through the camp gate.

After the war, she immigrated to Palestine on 15 September 1945 and in 1960 returned to Germany with her husband and two children. At the beginning of the 1980s, she created the musical group Coincidence, with her daughter Edna and her son Joram. They sang songs from the ghetto and in Hebrew as well as anti-fascist songs.

Béjarano lived in Hamburg. She was a co-founder and chairman of the International Auschwitz Committee and honorary chairperson of the Union of Persecutees of the Nazi Regime. She was active for the Committee until her death.

Béjarano died in Hamburg on 10 July 2021, aged 96. She was one of the last surviving orchestra members.

Awards and honours 
In 2008, Béjarano became honorary president of the Union of Persecutees of the Nazi Regime. She received the Herbert Wehner Medal in 2010.

Béjarano held the Cross of Merit, First class, of the Order of Merit of the Federal Republic of Germany, since 2012. She was honoured with ethecon's 2013 "Blue Planet Award"  for her "relentless activity for peace and against anti-Semitism, racism and fascism". In 2014, she was awarded the Giesbert Lewin Prize of the Cologne chapter of the Societies for Christian-Jewish Collaboration. She became honorary citizen of her birth town Saarlouis the same year on the occasion of her 90th birthday. The Gemeinschaftsschule school in Wiesloch was named after her in 2020. The same year, she was awarded the Hermann Maas Prize for her activities against racism and exclusion, and for her political commitment.

Publications 
 
 Lieder für das Leben. Curio-Verlag, Hamburg 1995, .
 Man nannte mich Krümel'. Curio-Verlag, Hamburg 1989, .

 Film 
 Esther che suonava la fisarmonica nell’orchestra di Auschwitz, Regia di Elena Valsania, Felìz – Edizioni SEB27, DVD allegato al volume: Esther Béjarano, "La ragazza con la fisarmonica. Dall’orchestra di Auschwitz alla musica Rap", A cura di Antonella Romeo, Prefazione di Bruno Maida, Edizioni SEB27, 2013; 

 References 

 Further reading 
 Esther Béjarano and Birgit Gärtner, Wir leben trotzdem: Esther Béjarano – vom Mädchenorchester in Auschwitz zur Künstlerin für den Frieden ("We live, nevertheless: Esther Béjarano – from Girl Orchestra in Auschwitz to artist for peace"), Pahl-Rugenstein, Bonn (2005); 3rd edition, corrected and expanded (2007),  
 Esther Béjarano, "La ragazza con la fisarmonica. Dall’orchestra di Auschwitz alla musica Rap", A cura di Antonella Romeo, Prefazione di Bruno Maida, Allegato DVD "Esther che suonava la fisarmonica nell’orchestra di Auschwitz" (in Italian), Regia di Elena Valsania, Edizioni SEB27, 2013, 
 Thomas Gonschior, : Mut zum Leben. Die Botschaft der Überlebenden von Auschwitz. (including an essay Bejarano) Europa Verlag, Berlin u. a. 2014, .
 : Damit nie wieder geschehe, was damals geschah (in German). In: Perlensau. Ausgewählte Gedichte. , Berlin 2009, .
 Yurtseven, Kutlu, Rosario Pennino, and Joram Bejarano. Esther Bejarano mit microphone mafia live in Kuba''. (in German, illustrated, Verlag Wiljo Heinen, Berlin/Böklund 2017, .

External links 

 
 
 The Wooden Shoes (audio play, excerpts, in German), Radio Bremen, 24 January 2002 
 

1924 births
2021 deaths
Auschwitz concentration camp survivors
German emigrants to Mandatory Palestine
20th-century German Jews
International Auschwitz Committee members
Officers Crosses of the Order of Merit of the Federal Republic of Germany
People from Saarlouis
Ravensbrück concentration camp survivors
Union of Persecutees of the Nazi Regime members
Women's Orchestra of Auschwitz members